The men's 100 metres at the 2006 European Athletics Championships were held at the Ullevi on August 7 and August 8.
Portugal's Francis Obikwelu added the European title to his Olympic Games silver medal in Athens. The 27-year-old was all but last out of the blocks but showed his class with a brilliant surge of pace to finish in 9.99 seconds - the first time the European title has been won with a sub-10 second time. Poland's Dariusz Kuć delayed the drama with a nervy false start.

Medalists

Schedule

Results

Round 1
Qualification: First 4 in each heat (Q) and the next 8 fastest (q) advance to the Round 2.

Round 2
Qualification: First 4 in each heat (Q)  advance to the semifinals.

Semifinals
First 4 of each Semifinal will be directly qualified (Q) for the Final.

Semifinal 1

Semifinal 2

Final

External links
Results

100
100 metres at the European Athletics Championships